Humphrey is a city in Arkansas and Jefferson counties in the U.S. state of Arkansas. Its population was 557 at the 2010 census. It is included in  the Pine Bluff Metropolitan Statistical Area.

Geography

Demographics

As of the census of 2000, there were 806 people, 319 households, and 209 families residing in the city. The racial makeup of the city was 57.82% White, 40.45% Black or African American, 1.20% Native American, 1.00% from other races, and 1.49% from two or more races.  0.87% of the population were Hispanic or Latino of any race.

There were 319 households, out of which 34.8% had children under the age of 18 living with them, 46.1% were married couples living together, 16.0% had a female householder with no husband present, and 34.2% were non-families. 31.7% of all households were made up of individuals, and 13.5% had someone living alone who was 65 years of age or older.  The average household size was 2.53 and the average family size was 3.20.

In the city, the population was spread out, with 30.5% under the age of 18, 7.7% from 18 to 24, 26.1% from 25 to 44, 22.2% from 45 to 64, and 13.5% who were 65 years of age or older.  The median age was 36 years. For every 100 females, there were 84.9 males.  For every 100 females age 18 and over, there were 81.2 males.

The median income for a household in the city was $25,880, and the median income for a family was $33,824. Males had a median income of $25,163 versus $23,472 for females. The per capita income for the city was $12,517.  About 23.7% of families and 22.9% of the population were below the poverty line, including 27.9% of those under age 18 and 21.4% of those age 65 or over.

Education
Humphrey is in the DeWitt School District, which operates DeWitt High School. On July 1, 2004, the Humphrey School District, along with the Gillett School District, consolidated into the DeWitt district. The DeWitt district voted to close Humphrey Elementary School in 2009.

References

Further reading

External links

 

Cities in Arkansas County, Arkansas
Cities in Jefferson County, Arkansas
Cities in Arkansas
Cities in Pine Bluff metropolitan area